Mravinjac may refer to:

 Mravinjac, Bosnia and Herzegovina, a village near Goražde
 Mravinjac, Croatia, a village near Dubrovnik